The 1988 Missouri Valley Conference men's basketball tournament was played after the conclusion of the 1987–1988 regular season at Carver Arena in Peoria, Illinois.

The fourteenth ranked Bradley Braves defeated the Illinois State Redbirds in the championship game, 89-59, and won their 2nd MVC Tournament title and earned an automatic bid to the 1988 NCAA tournament.

Bracket

References

1987–88 Missouri Valley Conference men's basketball season
Missouri Valley Conference men's basketball tournament
Missouri Valley Conference men's basketball tournament
Missouri Valley Conference men's basketball tournament